Rigobert Salomon Guy Bengondo (8 August 1987 – 29 November 2013) was a Cameroonian footballer that played for Persipro Probolinggo in the Liga Indonesia Premier Division (LPIS). He previously played for Persikota Tangerang in the 2009-10 Liga Indonesia Premier Division.

He died on 29 November 2013 in Tangerang, Banten, Indonesia.

References

External links

1987 births
Association football forwards
Cameroonian expatriate footballers
Cameroonian expatriate sportspeople in Indonesia
Cameroonian footballers
Expatriate footballers in Indonesia
Liga 1 (Indonesia) players
Indonesian Premier Division players
2013 deaths
Footballers from Yaoundé
Persih Tembilahan players
Persikota Tangerang players
Persipro Probolinggo players
PSIS Semarang players